Notable natives and former residents of Chesterton, Indiana include:

Academics
Avery Craven, historian of nineteenth-century United States and the American Civil War

Athletes

Baseball
Bill Collins, outfielder in Major League Baseball
Ron Kittle, former Major League Baseball player
Mickey Morandini, former Major League Baseball player

Basketball
Bob Dille, retired basketball player and championship high school coach
Mitch McGary, star player from Chesterton who went to Michigan; led the team to the NCAA men's final in 2012-2013

Martial arts
Eddie Wineland, MMA fighter with Ultimate Fighting Championship (Bantamweight)

Entertainers

Jim Gaffigan, standup comedian and actor

References

Chesterton
Chesterton